Longhill is in the north-east of Kingston upon Hull, in the East Riding of Yorkshire,  England. It was mainly built during the 1950s, with more than half of the homes now belonging to private owner occupiers.
On Longhill, there are plenty of facilities for all ages, including a recreational centre known as Eastmount.
The local primary schools on Longhill are: Longhill Primary School and Wansbeck Primary School. 
The nearest secondary schools to Longhill are: The Marvell College, Archbishop Sentamu Academy, Malet Lambert and Winifred Holtby Academy.
Longhill is served by Labour MP for East Hull - Karl Turner.
Longhill has bus services provided by East Yorkshire Motor Services - routes 56 and 57.

Housing estates in Kingston upon Hull